is a Japanese actress, singer and former fashion model, regularly appearing on television in various roles.

Career
In November 2010, Akita Prefecture chose her as one of the two official PR-Ambassadors, along with Nozomi Sasaki, with the purpose of creating a better image for the prefecture.

Personal life
Katō is known for being a fan of anime and manga. On June 6, 2014, she announced on her blog that she was married to a man from non-celebrity industry. Their wedding ceremony was held on March 16, 2015. On March 12, 2016, during Kobe Collection 2016 SPRING/SUMMER fashion event, she announced she was pregnant. On July 7, she gave birth to a healthy baby girl.

Filmography

Film

Television

References

External links
  

1985 births
Living people
Japanese female models
Japanese film actresses
Japanese television actresses
Models from Akita Prefecture
Actors from Akita Prefecture
20th-century Japanese actresses
21st-century Japanese actresses